Kishori Ballal (1937/1938 – 18 February 2020) was an Indian actress who was known for her works in Kannada cinema.

The actress made her debut in 1960 with Ivalentha Hendthi and since then in a career spanning over 15 years, she has appeared in 72 films and along the way has worked with some of the most renowned directors and stalwart actors. Apart from Kannada film, the actress has also worked in Hindi films most notably as the caretaker of Shah Rukh Khan in the critically acclaimed Swades. Her 2016 release includes Mahaveera Machideva and Aasra. Television roles include the matriarch in long running serial Amruthavarshini.

She died on 18 February 2020 due to age-related ailments.

Filmography 
2016 Kahi (as ajji)
 2016 Aasra (second billing)
 2016 Naani (as Kishori Balal)
 2015 Ring Road Grand Mother (as Kishori Balal)
 2015 Carry On Maratha (as Kishori Balal)
 2015 Bombay Mittai (as Kishori Balal)
 2014 Aakramana
 2013 Galaate (as Kishori Balal)
 2012 Aiyyaa as Surya's mother
 2012 Bangarda Kural
 2011 Kempe Gowda Kavya's grandmother (as Kishori Balal)
2010 Lafangey Parindey
 2009 Quick Gun Murugun Mrs. S.G. Murugun
 2009 Jolly Days (as Ajji)
 2008 Akka Thangi (as Kishori Balal)
 2007 Aadavari Matalaku Arthale Verule  (as Bamma)
 2005 Nammanna (as Kishori Balal)
 2004 Swades (as Kaveri amma)
 2003 II Khushi (as Kishori Balal)
 2003 Ek Alag Mausam
 2000 Sparsha
 1989 Gair Kaanooni (as Kishori Bhallal)

See also 
 List of Bollywood actors

References

External links 
 

Date of birth missing
1930s births
2020 deaths
Indian film actresses
Actresses in Kannada cinema